The 2004 Big 12 women's basketball championship, known for sponsorship reasons as the 2004 Phillips 66 Big 12 Women's Basketball Championship, was the 2004 edition of the Big 12 Conference's championship tournament.  The tournament was held at the Reunion Arena in Dallas from 9 March until 13 March 2004.  The Quarterfinals, Semifinals, and Finals were televised on the ESPN family of networks. The championship game, held on March 12, 2004, featured the number 1 seeded Texas Longhorns, and the sixth seeded Oklahoma Sooners. Oklahoma won the tournament by posting a 66-47 victory over the Longhorns.

Seeding

Schedule

Tournament bracket

All-Tournament Team
Most Outstanding Player – Dionnah Jackson, Oklahoma

See also
2004 Big 12 Conference men's basketball tournament
2004 NCAA Women's Division I Basketball Tournament
2003–04 NCAA Division I women's basketball rankings

References

Basketball in the Dallas–Fort Worth metroplex
Big 12 Conference women's basketball tournament
Tournament
Big 12 Conference women's basketball tournament
Big 12 Conference women's basketball tournament